Beitostølen is a village in Øystre Slidre Municipality in Innlandet county, Norway. The lake Øyangen lies a short distance to the southwest of the village. The Norwegian County Road 51 runs through the village.

Sports
Beitostølen is largely a tourist area, with many holiday cabins and hotels serving various winter sports facilities. The village has hosted FIS Cross-Country World Cup and Biathlon World Cup competitions. Beitostølen is a year-round destination, and although the mountain village is best known to many as a winter sports destination due to its local alpine ski slopes, it also has cross-country skiing trails totaling . July is the month with the highest tourism rate due to hiking in the nearby Jotunheimen National Park to the north.

References

Øystre Slidre
Villages in Innlandet
Ski areas and resorts in Norway